is a Japanese Egyptologist, and has worked in tombs KVA and KV22 in the Valley of the Kings and with ARTP. He is a Professor of Archaeology at Waseda University, Tokyo.

References

Japanese Egyptologists
Living people
1951 births
Waseda University alumni